Pat Donnelly may refer to:

 Patrice Donnelly (born 1950), American track and field athlete who competed at the 1976 Summer Olympics
 Pat Donnelly (ice hockey, born 1942), Canadian ice hockey player 
 Pat Donnelly (ice hockey, born 1953), American ice hockey player who played in the World Hockey Association

See also
Patrick Donnelly (disambiguation)
Patricia Donnelly, beauty queen